Al Capone Does My Shirts is a historical fiction novel for young adults by the author Gennifer Choldenko. In the book, Moose Flanagan and his family move from Santa Monica to Alcatraz Island when his father takes a new job as an electrician and a guard in the well-known Alcatraz prison. The book was named a Newbery Honor selection, and in 2007 it received the California Young Reader Medal. It has three sequels: Al Capone Shines My Shoes, Al Capone Does My Homework, and Al Capone Throws Me a Curve.<ref>http://www.scholastic.com/teachers/lesson-plan/al-capone-does-my-shirts-discussion-guide</ref>

 Plot 
In the 1930s, Matthew "Moose" Flanagan and his family move from Santa Monica to Alcatraz Island when his father takes a new job as an electrician and a guard in the well-known Alcatraz prison. Moose becomes friends with the warden's daughter, Piper, who regularly gets into trouble in her attempts to earn money to get off of Alcatraz. Piper talks Moose into being part of her money-making schemes, like having inmates on the island do laundry for the kids at school. When the scheme fails and the Warden receives word of it, the children are punished and have to find a new way to spend their time.

In an attempt to gain acceptance,  Moose hangs around the prisoners' rec center in hopes of finding a stray baseball for use in games with the other kids. Moose eventually notices his older sister Natalie developing a relationship with convict 105, also known as Onion, who is trusted and able to roam freely because his sentence is almost up. Onion knows Moose has been looking for a baseball and gives him one. Scared of his sister hanging out with a convict, Moose is only reassured because of his confidence that she will be re-accepted to the Esther P. Marinoff School for people with special needs. Moose and his family's hopes are crushed when the school rejects Natalie. Desperate to help Natalie, Moose, with the help of Piper, writes a letter to the infamous criminal Al Capone, who works in Alcatraz's laundry. The letter asks Capone to pull any strings he has to help Moose's family get his sister back into school. Within days, Natalie is accepted into a new Esther P. Marinoff School branch for older children. The next day, Moose is getting ready for the day when he finds a note in the sleeve of his shirt with the word "Done" underlined.

Other stories
It has three sequels, Al Capone Shines My Shoes (2011) and Al Capone Does My Homework (2014) and Al Capone Throws Me a Curve (2018). A new book is in development.

Awards
Newbery Honor
California Young Reader Medal

Critical receptionKirkus Review gave the book a positive review, stating "Choldenko's pacing is exquisite, balancing the tense family dynamics alongside the often-humorous and riveting school story of peer pressure and friendship." Miranda Doyle of The School Library Journal says "The story, told with humor and skill, will fascinate readers with an interest in what it was like for the children of prison guards and other workers to grow up on Alcatraz Island." Ed Sullivan of Booklist'' states in his review, "With its unique setting and well-developed characters, this warm, engaging coming-of-age story has plenty of appeals, and Choldenko offers some fascinating historical background on Alcatraz Island in an afterword."

Stage performance
In 2011, the book was adapted as a stage performance at The Children's Theatre of Western Springs.

In 2019, the book was adapted as a stage performance at Mission Cultural Center by the San Francisco Youth Theatre.

References

External links
Author webpage 
Publishers Weekly review
Publisher webpage

2004 American novels
Newbery Honor-winning works
American young adult novels
Fiction set in 1935
Novels set in San Francisco
Alcatraz Island in fiction
Historical novels
Novels set on islands
Gangs in fiction
Cultural depictions of Al Capone
2004 children's books